The 2012–13 season is Yokohama FC Hong Kong's debut season in the Hong Kong First Division League. They will be competing in the Hong Kong First Division League, Senior Challenge Shield and the FA Cup.

Key events 
 27 May 2012: Yokohama F.C. confirmed that their youth team will not join the newly formed team Yokohama FC Hong Kong. Instead, all Sham Shui Po players will join the club along with some Japanese player.
 18 June 2012: Hong Kong goalkeeper Tsang Man Fai, who spent the second-half of last season as a loanee in TSW Pegasus, joined the newly formed Yokohama FC Hong Kong from Rangers for an undisclosed fee.
 17 July 2012: Yokohama FC Hong Kong confirmed that Mirko Teodorović and Čedomir Mijanović joined the club from Tuen Mun. Serbian defender Aleksandar Brajovic also joined the club from Serbian First League side FK Timok after Mirko and Mijanović suggested the club to sign him.
 27 July 2012: Japanese attacking midfielder Tsuyoshi Yoshitake confirmed he would join Yokohama FC Hong Kong from North American Soccer League club Tampa Bay Rowdies.
 12 September 2012: Chinese midfielder Li Jian joins the club on loan from Biu Chun Rangers until the end of the season.
 20 December 2012: Japanese goalkeeper Taiki Murai joins the club on loan from J2 League club Yokohama F.C. until the end of the season. He will join the club on 1 January 2013.
 23 January 2013: Japanese forward Kenji Fukuda joins the club from J2 League club Ehime F.C. for an undisclosed fee.
 4 May 2013: The club survived from the relegation to secure a place for next season's First Division thanks to Kenji Fukuda's stoppage time score.

Players

Squad information 
As of 23 January 2013.

Transfers

In
Players who played for Sham Shui Po last season were not listed in the table below.

Out

Stats

Squad Stats

Top scorers
As of 4 May 2013

Disciplinary record
As of 4 May 2013

Competitions

Overall

First Division League

Classification

Results summary

Results by round

Matches

Pre-season

Competitive

First Division League

Remarks:
1 Home matches against Kitchee and South China are played at Mong Kok Stadium instead of their usual home ground Siu Sai Wan Sports Ground.
2 Away match against Sunray Cave JC Sun Hei was originally played on 2 March 2013 but was postponed and rescheduled on 23 March 2013.
3 The match was abandoned after 28 minutes due to adverse weather and bad pitch conditions.
4 The replay of week 15 match against Yokohama FC Hong Kong was scheduled to be played at Siu Sai Wan Sports Ground on 4 April 2013.

Senior Challenge Shield

First round

FA Cup

Quarter-finals

References

Yokohama FC Hong Kong seasons
Yoko